Zheng Zheng (born 11 July 1989) is a Chinese professional footballer who currently plays as a left-back or centre-back for Chinese Super League club Shandong Taishan.

Club career
Zheng Zheng started his football career playing with Shandong Luneng's youth academy and was promoted to the first team during the 2008 season, where despite not making an appearance for the team he would still receive a league title medal from the club. He received his promotion to the senior team in 2010 when he made his debut for the club in a 1–0 loss against Pohang Steelers on 24 March 2010. Despite the defeat, Zheng would go on to become a vital member of the team and would go on to score his first goal for the club on 16 May 2010 in a 1–0 win against Shenzhen Ruby. Zheng would have such a breakthrough season that he would not only win the league title with Shandong, but also personally win the Chinese Football Association Young Player of the Year award to cap off an extremely successful season. 

On 23 June 2016, Zheng suffered a rupture of ligament in his left knee in the training, ruling him out for the rest of the season. He made his return on 2 May 2017 in a 2017 Chinese FA Cup match against Jilin Baijia. A consistent regular within the team, he would gain his third league title with the club when he was part of the team that won the 2021 Chinese Super League title. On 30 October 2022, Zheng would show his importance towards the team when he made his 275 league appearance for Shandong in a 3-1 home win against Shanghai Port, becoming record league appearance maker for the club, surpassing former captain Shu Chang.

International career
Zheng would play for the Chinese under-20 national team that took part in the 2008 AFC U-19 Championship where he played in all four games for China in a tournament where they were knocked out in the quarterfinals. Zheng would still move up to the Chinese under-23 national team where he played in the 2008 East Asian Games. He played in two games as China were knocked out in the group stage. Zheng would also make the squad that took part in the 2010 Asian Games; however, he was injured throughout the tournament and didn't make any appearances.

Zheng made his first appearance for the Chinese national team on 6 October 2011 in a friendly match against United Arab Emirates. Zheng scored his first two international goals on 15 November 2011 in a 4–0 win against Singapore during 2014 FIFA World Cup qualification.

Career statistics

Club 
Statistics accurate as of match played 31 January 2023.

International statistics

International goals

Honours

Club
Shandong Luneng/ Shandong Taishan
Chinese Super League: 2008, 2010, 2021
Chinese FA Cup: 2014, 2020, 2021, 2022
Chinese FA Super Cup: 2015

Individual
Chinese Football Association Young Player of the Year: 2010
Chinese Super League Team of the Year: 2012, 2013, 2014

References

External links
Player stats at Sohu.com
 

1989 births
Living people
Sportspeople from Jinan
Chinese footballers
Footballers from Shandong
Shandong Taishan F.C. players
Chinese Super League players
China international footballers
Footballers at the 2010 Asian Games
Association football defenders
Asian Games competitors for China